Ankang Fuqiang Airport is an airport in Ankang, Shaanxi province, China, located  northwest of city center in the town of Wuli (formerly in Fuqiang Township, its namesake), Hanbin District. Proposed as a replacement of Ankang Wulipu Airport, the Fuqiang Airport project commenced in 2013, and its construction began in December 2015, with an estimated total investment of 2.35 billion yuan. The airport opened on September 25, 2020 for public use, as its first commercial flight China Southern Airlines CZ5269 arrived from Guangzhou.

Facilities
The airport has a 2,600-meter runway and a 5,500 square-meter terminal building. It was designed with the capacity to serve 300,000 passengers and process 750 tons of cargo per year.

Airlines and destinations

See also
List of airports in China
List of the busiest airports in China

References

Airports in Shaanxi
Ankang